The Dr. Emmett Snipes House was a historic house at South Market and North Locust Streets in Searcy, Arkansas.  It was a -story wood-frame structure, with Folk Victorian styling.  It had a wraparound porch with turned posts and jigsawn brackets, and applied Stick style detailing on the exterior gables.  It was built c. 1900 for Dr. Emmett Snipes, a prominent local druggist who also served as mayor of Searcy for two years.

The house was listed on the National Register of Historic Places in 1991.  It has been listed as destroyed in the Arkansas Historic Preservation Program database.

See also
National Register of Historic Places listings in White County, Arkansas

References

Houses on the National Register of Historic Places in Arkansas
Houses completed in 1900
Houses in Searcy, Arkansas
Demolished buildings and structures in Arkansas
National Register of Historic Places in Searcy, Arkansas
1900 establishments in Arkansas